"All I Want Is You" is a song by Irish rock band U2. It is the final track on their 1988 album, Rattle and Hum, and was released as its fourth and final single on 12 June 1989. It also appears in the Rattle and Hum film, playing over the closing credits.

History
"All I Want Is You" was released in the UK as a single on 12 June 1989. The B-side featured covers of The Righteous Brothers' "Unchained Melody", and a cover of Love Affair's "Everlasting Love". It reached number 4 in the UK charts and number 2 in Australia, number 12 on the Dutch Top 40, but only reached number 67 and number 83 in the Canadian and American charts, respectively.  It appeared on the soundtrack for the 1994 film Reality Bites. The popularity of the song in the film led to a re-release in 1994 where it reached number 38 in the U.S. Top 40 Mainstream charts. The single was rereleased in the Netherlands with "Everlasting Love" now being the a-side. "Everlasting Love" reached number 10 in the Dutch Charts, in January 1990. In 2004, it was ranked number 9 in Entertainment Weeklys list of "The 50 Greatest Love Songs."

String arrangements on the song are by Van Dyke Parks. Benmont Tench is credited for keyboards, though he said in an interview in The Boston Globe in 2014: "I couldn't figure out what to play because the song seemed complete, and eventually the Edge said, ‘Why don’t you play this little figure?’ and it’s in there somewhere buried in the mix and as a result everyone always credits me with having played with U2."

It is also featured during an episode of Hindsight and the final scenes of the 2011 film Contagion. The song "October" appears on the compilation album The Best of 1980–1990 as a hidden track encoded within the track for "All I Want Is You" following about a minute of silence.

Music video
Director Meiert Avis shot the promotional video in the town of Ostia, outside Rome on 18 April 1989. Written by Barry Devlin, the video takes an unusual cinematic approach to the song, with U2 band members making only brief cameo appearances. The video tells the story of a person with dwarfism, played by Paolo Risi, who falls in love with a trapeze artist, played by Paola Rinaldi, one of whom apparently dies towards the end. While there is disagreement amongst fans about exactly who has died, The Edge was quoted as saying it is the trapeze artist who dies.

The video pays homage to Fellini, who was shooting his last movie, La voce della luna, only a few miles away from the U2 set, and also to Tod Browning's 1932 film Freaks.

Live performances
"All I Want Is You" was played at almost every date of 1989's Lovetown Tour, occasionally seguing into "Bad", with which it shares considerable musical similarity. It has since been featured in some capacity at every subsequent tour until the Joshua Tree Tours 2017 and 2019. On the Zoo TV Tour in 1992 and 1993, it was usually merely a snippet at the end of "Bad," but occasionally Bono would perform a solo abbreviated version. The version played on 1997's PopMart Tour was much more complete, and subsequent live performances have been of the entire song. During its performance on 2001's Elevation Tour, it would segue into "Where the Streets Have No Name". Another version was eventually played on their Vertigo Tour, in the usual place of "Miracle Drug". The song also closed some shows of the 4th leg, in South America, and finally closed the tour in Honolulu, on 9 December 2006. "All I Want Is You" has also seen occasional appearances on the U2 360° Tour. At the 2 July 2011 show in Nashville, Bono invited a blind fan onstage to play "All I Want Is You" on guitar for his wife after normal set closer "Moment of Surrender". After the song, Bono gave the fan his Gretsch Irish Falcon guitar. The song was played six times on the Innocence + Experience Tour. The song was not played on the Joshua Tree Tours 2017 and 2019 or the Experience + Innocence Tour in 2018, but was played at a promotional appearance in 2017 for the Songs of Experience album, and featured an orchestra for the first time. Performances on video are also included on PopMart: Live from Mexico City, U2 Go Home: Live from Slane Castle, Ireland, and Vertigo 05: Live from Milan.

Track listings
The first track on all versions of the single is an edited version of "All I Want Is You." "Unchained Melody" was featured on the 7", 12" and CD versions of the single, and the full version of "All I Want Is You" was only featured on the CD versions of the single.

Personnel
 U2
 Bono – vocals, guitar
 The Edge – guitar
 Adam Clayton – bass
 Larry Mullen Jr. – drums

Additional performers
 Van Dyke Parks – string arrangement
 Benmont Tench – keyboards

Chart positions

"All I Want Is You"

"Everlasting Love"

Bellefire version

"All I Want Is You" was covered by Irish girl group Bellefire for their debut album, After the Rain (2001). It reached number three in Ireland and number 18 in the UK.

Track listing

An enhanced version of the CD contains the video for "All I Want Is You."

Charts

Weekly charts

Year-end charts

Brian McFadden version

"All I Want Is You" was covered by Brian McFadden, an Irish musician formerly of Westlife, for his album The Irish Connection. The song features guest vocals from Ronan Keating, frontman of fellow Irish boyband Boyzone. It was released as a single on 25 February 2013.

Music video
The accompanying music video sees McFadden performing the track during a UK tour earlier this year. The video did not feature Ronan Keating.

See also
List of covers of U2 songs – All I Want Is You

References

External links
 Profile of music video director Meiert Avis on IMDB, also credited as one of the directors on U2: The Best of 1990–2000

1980s ballads
1988 songs
1989 singles
2002 singles
2013 singles
Bellefire songs
Black-and-white music videos
Glen Campbell songs
Island Records singles
Music videos directed by Meiert Avis
Rock ballads
Song recordings produced by Jimmy Iovine
Songs written by Adam Clayton
Songs written by Bono
Songs written by the Edge
Songs written by Larry Mullen Jr.
U2 songs
Virgin Records singles